William Morrison (21 May 1850 – 31 October 1910) was a New Zealand cricketer. He played two first-class matches for Otago between 1876 and 1881.

See also
 List of Otago representative cricketers

References

External links
 

1850 births
1910 deaths
New Zealand cricketers
Otago cricketers
Sportspeople from Clackmannanshire
British emigrants to New Zealand